Kristin Fortune is an American ice dancer. With partner Dennis Sveum, she was the 1965 and 1966 U.S. national champion. They won the silver medal at the 1966 World Figure Skating Championships.

Fortune and Sveum were coached by Jean Westwood and Charles Phillips.

Results
(with Dennis Sveum)

References

American female ice dancers
Living people
Year of birth missing (living people)
World Figure Skating Championships medalists
21st-century American women